Julian Henry is a marketing executive based in London and Los Angeles. He has worked in PR and journalism since the 1980s. He founded the agency Henry's House in the 1990s and was appointed Head of Communication for Simon Fuller's 19 Entertainment in 2006.

Family
Henry is the son of Brian Henry, well-known figure in independent TV in London and great-nephew of Elizabeth Craig MBE Scottish journalist, cook  and author. She appeared on the 'over 90s' show on BBC TV Parkinson in 1978 aged 95 alongside Rt Honourable Manny Shinwell MP and the playwright Ben Travers CBE.

Julian Henry is great-nephew of Arthur Mann,  war correspondent for the Washington Post, New York Times and broadcaster for Mutual Broadcasting Company. Mann reported from both WW1 and WW2 from bases in Europe as a contemporary of Edward Murrow and Richard Dimbleby and became a well known voice across America during the 1940s through his weekly radio reports from the London Blitz.

Henry is the brother of copywriter Susie Henry, D&AD Gold Award winner, creator of the slogan "We Won't Make A Drama Out of a Crisis" and founder of advertising agency Waldron Allen Henry & Thompson. He has two other sisters, Louise and Deborah, who is his twin, lives in London and Oxford and has two children: George (born 1997) and Harriet (born 1999).

Career

PR and Marketing

Henry's first job in marketing was as a publicist in London in 1979 repping clients that included Billy Idol, Blondie, The dBs, Hazel O'Connor, Billy Bragg, Joe Jackson while pursuing a career as a songwriter and music journalist.

In 1986, Henry joined fashion agency Lynne Franks and remained there ten years as she promoted the careers of Jean Paul Gaultier, Katharine Hamnett, Rifat Ozbek and other influential designers, eventually becoming Deputy Managing Director.  In 1987, Henry met music manager Simon Fuller and began a working relationship that lasts to the current day and was enlisted to promote Annie Lennox solo album Diva. He remains one of Fuller closest advisors and has taken on a senior role at 19 Entertainment as global head of communication.

He became a director of Lynne Franks PR in 1991 with his own brand roster including Absolut Vodka, Coca-Cola, BBC Radio 1, HMV Music Stores, Yamaha, Sega, The Spice Girls and TV shows including BAFTA award winning C4 show Network 7.  While at LFPR, Henry co-produced two x 30 minute TV shows for BBC TV 'Yamaha Band Explosion' (BBC), which featured early performances by notable bands including Teenage Fanclub, Manic Street Preachers, Blur and Radiohead.

Between 1996 and 1998, he was a member of the Spice Girls' management team. In 1998 he launched his own PR company, Henry's House with Simon Fuller as a fellow director. While running Henry's House, he publicised Tango, Big Brother, Coca-Cola, Absolut Vodka, Pop Idol and various TV shows and celebrities. In 2003 Henry began to represent David & Victoria Beckham.

In 2004, Julian Henry was listed Top 10 Marketing & PR executives in the UK and two years later he took on the role of Head of Communications at Simon Fuller's 19 Entertainment. Henry took on David and Victoria Beckham, the American Idol TV show (at the time the No.1 rated show in America) as well as corporate affairs for Fuller, he orchestrated the Beckham move to LA in 2007 working from Fuller's Los Angeles office in West Hollywood. He collected 'Best Emerging Designer' Award for Victoria Beckham in London in 2011.

In 2013, Henry undertook several tours of China to promote Beckham's role as Ambassador for Chinese football. Henry is no longer involved with Henry's House; he was a Trustee of The ICA from 2001 to 2008 and writes an occasional newspaper column for The Guardian. Henry is listed No.2 in 2018 PRWeek UK Powerbook list of UK Entertainment Publicists.

Writing

In the 1980s and 1990s, Henry wrote articles and reviews for Melody Maker, NME, Telegraph, RM, Music Week and others; while contributing to Underground Magazine Henry unearthed Liverpool group The La's who he introduced to Go Discs chief Andy McDonald. Between 2004 and 2010 he wrote a weekly column for The Guardian on Marketing and Media issues.

In 2008 and 2009 Julian Henry wrote articles in UK press criticising the appointment of Andy Coulson as the British Prime Minister Head of Communications, and commented publicly since on the subsequent phone hacking scandal that has enveloped the British tabloids.

Music

Henry has recorded and released music with his group The Hit Parade since 1985. In 1990s, they embarked on tours of Japan, UK, USA and released CDs that were critically applauded but never commercially successful. In the 1990s, the band recorded 'In Gunnersbury Park' for Sarah Records. In 2011, following the release of a new record by the Hit Parade, Guardian journalist Alexis Petridis interviewed Henry about his dual existence as PR agent and musician. Henry is a regular spokesperson on popular culture.

Selected publications
One picture does not a charity campaign make (21.11.05) The Guardian.
How tabloid editors play the publicity game (19 December 2005) The Guardian.
These budget cuts will hit the BBC where it hurts (16.1.06) The Guardian.
In praise of pure PR – selling to the sceptical (20.2.06) The Guardian.
Merger gives our suburban services a Hollywood edge(3.4.06) The Guardian.
I suspect some Arctic Monkey business (24.4.06) The Guardian.
Is building Brand UK a mission impossible? (29.5.06) The Guardian.
The hippest brands keep their eyes on the streets (10/7/06) The Guardian.
The day Lord Levy showed me the truth (14/8/06) The Guardian.
A successful formula goes up in smoke (25/09/06) The Guardian.
The Holy Grail of eternal appeal (23/10/06) The Guardian.
The Celebrity Untouchables (20/11/06) The Guardian.
Big causes, celebrity effects and the real holy grail (18/12/06) The Guardian.
Why waste money on lessons from the School of the Bleedin' Obvious? (30/04/07) The Guardian.
Coulson's Tory Party conference test (24/09/07) The Guardian.
Julian Henry's double life (26/05/11) The Guardian.

References

1959 births
Living people
British public relations people